This is a list of notable Azerbaijani generals and admirals, which is arranged alphabetically.

Note that these generals and admirals were under the allegiance of separate successive armies under different states, and some served in more than one. These states in succession include the Russian Empire, the Azerbaijan Democratic Republic, the Soviet Union and the current Republic of Azerbaijan.

A 
 Safar Abiyev — Colonel General of the Azerbaijani Armed Forces of the Republic of Azerbaijan and Chief of General Staff of Azerbaijani Armed Forces of the Republic of Azerbaijan, and recipient of the Shohrat Order
 Sadykh bey Aghabekov — Major General of the Imperial Russian Army
 Tahir Aliyev — Major General of the Azerbaijani Armed Forces of the Republic of Azerbaijan
 Rufat Amirov — Colonel General and acting Chief of General Staff of Azerbaijani Armed Forces of the Republic of Azerbaijan
 Mahammad Asadov — Major General of the Azerbaijani Armed Forces of the Republic of Azerbaijan
 Rafig Asgarov — Counter Admiral and Commander of the Azerbaijani Naval Forces of the Republic of Azerbaijan
 Hazi Aslanov — Major General of the Soviet Army, and twice recipient of the Hero of the Soviet Union award

B 
 Valeh Barshadly — Lieutenant General of the Soviet Army and the Azerbaijani Armed Forces and Chief of General Staff of Azerbaijani Armed Forces of the Republic of Azerbaijan
 Beshir Imanov — Major General of the Soviet Union
Mais Barkhudarov — Azerbaijani officer, major general of Armed Forces of Azerbaijan

G 
 Abdulhamid bey Gaytabashi — Major General of the Azerbaijani Armed Forces of the Azerbaijan Democratic Republic and Chief of General Staff of Azerbaijani Armed Forces of the Azerbaijan Democratic Republic

H 
 Zakir Hasanov — Colonel General of the Azerbaijani Armed Forces and Minister of Defense of Azerbaijan
Hikmat Hasanov — an Azerbaijani Major General, who is the Commander of the 1st Army Corps
Polad Hashimov — Azerbaijani army officer and major general

K 
 Kerim Kerimov — Lieutenant General of the Soviet Army
 Rustam Khan Khoyski — Lieutenant General of the Imperial Russian Army
Ismayil bek Kutkashensky — Major General of the Imperial Russian Army and first Azerbaijani ever to be decorated with Order of St. George

M 
 Eldar Mahmudov — Lieutenant General of the Azerbaijani Armed Forces of the Republic of Azerbaijan, and recipient of the Azerbaijani Flag Order
 Mammadrafi Mammadov — Lieutenant General of the Soviet Army and the Azerbaijani Armed Forces of the Republic of Azerbaijan
 Tajaddin Mehdiyev — Major General of the Azerbaijani Armed Forces of the Republic of Azerbaijan
 Samad bey Mehmandarov — General of the Artillery of the Imperial Russian Army 
 Shahin Musayev — Colonel General of the Azerbaijani Armed Forces of the Republic of Azerbaijan and Chief of General Staff of Azerbaijani Armed Forces of the Republic of Azerbaijan
 Vahid Musayev — Major General of the Azerbaijani Armed Forces of the Republic of Azerbaijan
Hikmat Mirzayev — an Azerbaijani military officer, lieutenant general of the Azerbaijani Armed Forces, Commander of the Special Forces

N 
 Jamshid Nakhchivanski — Lieutenant General of the Azerbaijani Armed Forces of the Azerbaijan Democratic Republic and Combrig (equivalent to Brigadier General) of the Soviet Army

R 
 Dadash Rzayev — Major General of the Azerbaijani Armed Forces of the Republic of Azerbaijan, and recipient of the Azerbaijani Flag Order

S 
 Najmaddin Sadigov — Colonel General and Chief of General Staff of Azerbaijani Armed Forces of the Republic of Azerbaijan
 Nuraddin Sadigov — Major General and Chief of General Staff of Azerbaijani Armed Forces of the Republic of Azerbaijan
 Habib Bey Salimov — Major General of the Imperial Russian Army and the Azerbaijani Armed Forces of the Azerbaijan Democratic Republic, and Chief of General Staff of Azerbaijani Armed Forces of the Azerbaijan Democratic Republic
 Ali-Agha Shikhlinski — Lieutenant General of the Russian Imperial Army and General of the Artillery of the Azerbaijan Democratic Republic
 Mammad Bey Shulkevich — Lieutenant General of the Imperial Russian Army and the Azerbaijani Armed Forces of the Azerbaijan Democratic Republic, and Chief of General Staff of Azerbaijani Armed Forces of the Azerbaijan Democratic Republic
 Khosrov bey Sultanov — Major General of the Imperial Russian Army 
 Shahin Sultanov — Vice Admiral and Commander of the Azerbaijani Naval Forces of the Republic of Azerbaijan, and recipient of the Azerbaijani Flag Order

U 
 Ibrahim bey Usubov — Major General of the Imperial Russian Army and the Azerbaijani Armed Forces of the Azerbaijan Democratic Republic
 Ramil Usubov — Colonel General of the Azerbaijani Armed Forces of the Republic of Azerbaijan, and recipient of the Azerbaijani Flag Order

References 

Lists of Azerbaijani military personnel
Lists of Azerbaijani people by occupation